Merrifieldia is a genus of moths in the family Pterophoridae.

Species

Merrifieldia alaica 
Merrifieldia baliodactylus 
Merrifieldia brandti 
Merrifieldia bystropogonis 
Merrifieldia calcarius 
Merrifieldia cana 
Merrifieldia caspius 
Merrifieldia chordodactylus 
Merrifieldia deprinsi 
Merrifieldia diwani 
Merrifieldia farsi 
Merrifieldia hedemanni 
Merrifieldia huberti 
Merrifieldia improvisa 
Merrifieldia innae 
Merrifieldia leucodactyla 
Merrifieldia malacodactylus 
†Merrifieldia oligocenicus (Bigot, Nel, & Nel, 1986)
Merrifieldia nigrocostata 
Merrifieldia particiliata 
Merrifieldia probolias 
Merrifieldia semiodactylus 
Merrifieldia tridactyla

References
 , 1999: Pterophoridae aus Zentralasien und angrenzenden Territorien.- 2. Teil (Lepidoptera). Quadrifina 2: 215–226. Full article: .

 
Pterophorini
Moth genera
Taxa named by J. W. Tutt